The 2014 All-Ireland Senior Ladies' Football Championship Final featured  and . LGFA president Pat Quill criticised the decision to have Cork and Dublin club championship fixtures occurring on the same day as the game, describing it as "unfair on those people, boyfriends and whatever, not being in a position to come along to support the girls".

Cork came from ten points down to defeat Dublin by 2–13 to 2–12 and win their ninth All-Ireland title. At half-time, Dublin were in control, leading by 1–7 to 0–4 and when Lindsay Peat netted her second goal in the 35th minute, Dublin established a 2–8 to 0–7 lead. With fifteen minutes remaining, Cork trailed by 0–6 to 2–10 and Dublin were on the verge of their second All-Ireland title. However Cork launched a comeback with goals from subs Rhona Ní Bhuachalla and Eimear Scally. The score was level at 2–11 each with seven minutes left. Dublin briefly regained the lead when Siobhán Woods scored a point before Cork levelled with a Ciara O'Sullivan point. Geraldine O'Flynn had the final say with a winning point two minutes from the end.

Dublin manager Gregory McGonigle had previously managed  in 2011 and 2013. The winning Cork team were later voted winners of the 2014 RTÉ Sports Team of the Year Award. They were the first female team to win the award. They received 27% of the vote, beating the Ireland men's national rugby union team, winners of the 2014 Six Nations Championship, by 11%.

Route to the Final

Match info

Teams

References

 
All-Ireland Senior Ladies' Football Championship Finals
Cork county ladies' football team matches
Dublin county ladies' football team matches
All-Ireland Senior Ladies' Football Championship Final
All-Ireland Senior Ladies' Football Championship Final, 2014